Sventsyansky Uyezd (Свенцянский уезд) was one of the seven subdivisions of the Vilna Governorate of the Russian Empire. It was situated in the northern part of the governorate. Its administrative centre was Švenčionys.

Demographics
At the time of the Russian Empire Census of 1897, Sventsyansky Uyezd had a population of 172,231. Of these, 47.5% spoke Belarusian, 33.8% Lithuanian, 7.1% Yiddish, 6.0% Polish, 5.4% Russian and 0.1% German as their native language.

References

 
Uezds of Vilna Governorate
Vilna Governorate